Szymanowo may refer to the following places:
Szymanowo, Rawicz County in Greater Poland Voivodeship (west-central Poland)
Szymanowo, Szamotuły County in Greater Poland Voivodeship (west-central Poland)
Szymanowo, Lublin Voivodeship (east Poland)
Szymanowo, Śrem County in Greater Poland Voivodeship (west-central Poland)
Szymanowo, Mrągowo County in Warmian-Masurian Voivodeship (north Poland)
Szymanowo, Ostróda County in Warmian-Masurian Voivodeship (north Poland)